In Islam, Jesus is believed to be the penultimate prophet and messenger of God and the Messiah.

In the Quran, Jesus is described as the Messiah, born of a virgin, performing miracles, accompanied by disciples, rejected by the Jewish establishment, and being raised to heaven. The Quran asserts that Jesus was not crucified nor died on the cross, but was miraculously saved by God. The Quran places Jesus amongst the greatest prophets, and mentions him with various titles. The prophethood of Jesus is preceded by that of Yahya and succeeded by Muhammad, the latter of whom Jesus is reported to have prophesied by using the name Ahmad.

The Quran rejects the Christian view of the divinity of Jesus as God incarnate, or the literal Son of God. It denies Jesus as a deity in several verses, and also mentions that Jesus did not claim to be divine. Muslims believe that Jesus' original message was altered, after him being raised alive. The monotheism of Jesus is emphasized in the Quran. Like all prophets in Islam, Jesus is also called a Muslim, as he preached that his followers should adopt the 'straight path'. Jesus is attributed with a vast number of miracles in Islamic tradition.

After these creatures would miraculously perish, Imam Mahdi and Jesus would rule the entire world, establish peace and justice, and die after a reign of 40 years. Some Muslims believe that he would then be buried alongside Muhammad at the fourth reserved tomb of the Green Dome in Medina.

Jesus is understood by Muslims to be one of the most important prophets of Islam. The place where Jesus is believed to return, the Umayyad Mosque in Damascus, is highly esteemed by Muslims as the fourth holiest site of Islam. Jesus is widely venerated in Sufism, with numerous ascetic and mystic literature being written and recited about the Islamic prophet.

Birth

Islam's account of Jesus begins with a prologue narrated several times in the Quran which first describes the birth of his mother, Mary, and her service in the Jerusalem temple while under the care of the prophet Zechariah, who would become the father of Yahya (John the Baptist). The Quran's birth narrative of Jesus begins at Quran 19:16–34 and Q3:45–53. This birth narrative has been recounted with certain variations and detailed additions by Islamic historians over the centuries. In the matter of the virgin birth of Jesus, while Islamic theology affirms Mary as a pure vessel, it does not follow the concept of Immaculate Conception as related to Mary's birth in some Christian traditions.

Annunciation

Islamic exegesis affirms the virginal birth of Jesus – similarly to the Gospel account and occurring in Bethlehem. The narrative of the virgin birth opens with an announcement to Mary by the angel Gabriel while Mary is being raised in the  Temple after having been pledged to God by her mother. Gabriel states she is honored over all women of all nations and has brought her glad tidings of a holy son.

Gabriel declares the son is to be named Jesus, the Messiah, proclaiming he will be called a great prophet. Mary, asking how she could conceive and have a child when no man had touched her, was answered by the angel that God can decree what he wills, and that it shall come to pass.

The narrative from the Quran continues with Mary, overcome by the pains of childbirth, being provided with a stream of water under her feet from which she could drink, and with a palm tree which she could shake so ripe dates would fall and be enjoyed. After giving birth, Mary carries the baby Jesus back to the temple and is asked by the temple elders about the child. Having been commanded by Gabriel to a vow of silence, she points to the infant Jesus and the infant proclaims:

Jesus speaking from the cradle is one of six miracles attributed to him in the Quran, an account which is also found in the Syriac Infancy Gospel, a sixth-century work. According to various  hadiths, Jesus and Mary did not cry at birth.

Birth narratives

The Islamic faith echoed some strands within the Christian tradition that Mary (or Maryam) was a literal virgin when Jesus was conceived. The most detailed account of the annunciation and birth of Jesus is provided in Surah 3 (Al Imran) and 19 (Maryam) of the Quran, where the story is narrated that God (Allah) sent an angel to announce that Maryam could shortly expect to bear a son, despite being a virgin.

Some academics have noted that the account in Surah 19 is particularly close to that in the Christian Gospel of Luke. The Annunciation to Mary is mentioned twice in the Quran, and in both instances Mary/Maryam is told that she was chosen by God to deliver a son. In the first instance, the bearer of the news (who is believed by most Muslims to be the archangel Gabriel), delivered the news in (Q3:42-47) as he takes the form of a man (Q19:16-22). The details of the conception are not discussed, but when Mary asks how she can bear a son in view of her chastity, she is told that God creates what he wills and that these things are easy for God.

The 8th-century Muslim historian Ibn Ishaq (704–767), wrote the account entitled  ('In the Beginning'), reporting that Zechariah is Mary's guardian briefly, and after being incapable of maintaining her, he entrusts her to a carpenter named George. Secluded in a church, she is joined by a young man named Joseph, and they help one another fetching water and other tasks. The account of the birth of Jesus follows the Quran's narrative, adding that the birth occurred in Bethlehem beside a palm tree with a manger.

The 10th-century Persian scholar Al-Tabari (839–923), mentions envoys arriving from the king of Persia with gifts (similar to the  Magi from the east) for the Messiah; the command to a man called Joseph (not specifically Mary's husband) to take her and the child to Egypt and later return to Nazareth.

The Fatimid Ismaili jurist Qadi al-Nu'man also contributed to the narrative, explaining that the virgin birth of Jesus is meant to be interpreted symbolically. In his interpretation, Mary was the follower, of the Imam Joachim ('Imran). Meanwhile, Mary received spiritual inspiration from God, revealing that he would invite a man (to the faith) who would become an exalted Speaker of a revealed religion. According to al-Nu'man, the verses "She said: Lord! How can I have a child when no man has touched me?" (Quran 3:47) and "neither have I been unchaste" (Quran 19:20) are symbolic of Mary's saying, "How can I conduct the invitation when the Imam of the Time has not given me permission to do so?" and "Nor shall I be unfaithful by acting against his command", respectively. To this, a celestial hierarch replies "Such is God. He creates [i.e., causes to pass] what he wills" (Quran 3:47).

Childhood

The Quran does not include the tradition of the Flight into Egypt, though sūra 23:50 could conceivably allude to it: "And we made the son of Maryam and his mother a sign; and we made them abide in an elevated place, full of quiet and watered with springs." However, narratives similar to the narrative found in the Gospels and non-canonical sources circulated in later Islamic tradition, with some details and elaborations being added over the centuries by Islamic writers and historians. Some narratives have Jesus and family staying in Egypt up to 12 years.

Al-Masudi wrote that Jesus as a boy studied the Jewish religion reading from the Psalms and found "traced in characters of light":

with Jesus then claiming:

In Egypt

Several narratives show some disparity and similarity in Islamic writings about Jesus' early childhood, specifically his time in Egypt with regard to duration and events. Most of the narratives are found in non-canonical Christian sources like, for example, the pre-Islamic Gospel of Thomas. One such disparity is from al-Athir in his The Perfection of History which contains a birth narrative stating Jesus was born in Egypt instead of Bethlehem.

Some other narratives of Jesus' childhood are popular Middle Eastern lore as highlighted by professor of interfaith studies Mahmoud M. Ayoub. Many miracles are attributed to a young Jesus while in Egypt (see §§ Miracles and Other miracles).

Adulthood

Mission

It is generally agreed that Jesus spoke Aramaic, the common language of Judea in the first century AD and the region at-large.

The first and earliest view of Jesus formulated in Islamic thought is that of a prophet – a human being chosen by God to present both a judgment upon humanity for worshipping idols and a challenge to turn to the one true God. From this basis, reflected upon all previous prophets through the lens of Muslim identity, Jesus is considered no more than a messenger repeating a repetitive message of the ages. The miracles of Jesus and the Quranic titles attributed to Jesus demonstrate the power of God rather than the divinity of Jesus – the same power behind the message of all prophets. Some Islamic traditions believe Jesus' mission was only to the people of Israel and his status as a prophet being confirmed by numerous miracles.

A second early high image of Jesus is an end-time figure. This concept arises mostly from the Hadith. Muslim tradition constructs a narrative similarly found in Christian theology, seeing Jesus arriving at the end of time and descending upon earth to fight the Antichrist. This narrative is understood to champion the cause of Islam, with some traditions narrating Jesus pointing to the primacy of Muhammad. Most traditions state Jesus will then die a natural death.

A third and distinctive image is of Jesus representing an ascetic figure – a prophet of the heart. Although the Quran refers to the 'gospel' of Jesus, those specific teachings of his are not mentioned in the Quran or later religious texts. They are largely absent. The Sufi tradition is where Jesus became revered, acknowledged as a spiritual teacher with a distinctive voice from other prophets, including Muhammad. Sufism tends to explore the dimensions of union with God through many approaches, including asceticism, poetry, philosophy, speculative suggestion, and mystical methods. Although Sufism to the Western mind may seem to share similar origins or elements of Neoplatonism, Gnosticism, and Buddhism, the ideology is distinctly Islamic since they adhere to the words of the Quran and pursue imitation of Muhammad as the perfect man.

Preaching
The Islamic concepts of Jesus' preaching is believed to have originated in Kufa, Iraq, under the Rashidun Caliphate where the earliest writers of Muslim tradition and scholarship was formulated. The concepts of Jesus and his preaching ministry developed in Kufa was adopted from the early ascetic Christians of Egypt who opposed official church bishopric appointments from Rome.

These sayings fall into four basic groups:

 eschatological sayings;
 quasi-Gospel sayings;
 ascetic sayings and stories;
 sayings echoing intra-Muslim polemics.

The first group of sayings expands Jesus' archetype as portrayed in the Quran. The second group of stories, although containing a Gospel core, are expanded with a "distinctly Islamic stamp". The third group, being the largest of the four, portrays Jesus as a patron saint of Muslim asceticism. The last group builds upon the Islamic archetype and Muslim-centric definition of Jesus and his attributes, furthering esoteric ideas regarding terms such as "Spirit of God" and "Word of God".

Miracles

The Quran attributes at least six miracles to Jesus, with many more being added over the centuries by writers and historians. In Christ in the Quran and Modern Arabic Literature (1960), Al-Husayni said it is noteworthy Muhammad attributes no miracles to himself.

These six miracles in the Quran are without detail unlike the Gospel and their non-canonical Gnostic sources, which include details and mention other attributed miracles. Over the centuries, these six miracle narratives have been elaborated through Hadith and poetry, with religious writings including some of the other miracles mentioned in the Gospel, non-canonical sources, and from lore.

Speaking from the cradle
Speaking from the cradle is mentioned in three places in the Quran: al-Imran (3) 41, 46, al-Maida (5) 109–110 and Maryam (19) 29–30. Part of the narrative has the infant Jesus defending his mother Mary from the accusation of having given birth without a known husband. Early Islam was unclear about Joseph and his role. Jesus speaks as the angel Gabriel had mentioned at the annunciation: Jesus proclaims he is a servant of God, has been given a book, is a prophet, is blessed wherever he will go, blesses the day he was born, the day he will die, and the day he is raised alive.

Although this particular narrative is not found in the Bible, the theme of speaking from the cradle is found in the non-canonical pre-Islamic Syriac Infancy Gospel. The Syriac Infancy Gospel has Jesus declaring himself the Son of God, the Word, and affirming what the angel Gabriel had previously announced to Mary as detailed in the Gospel.

Creating birds from clay
The miracle story of creating birds from clay and breathing life into them when a child is mentioned in al-Imran (3) 43, 49 and al-Maida (5) 109–110. Although this miracle is also not mentioned in the canonical Gospel, the same narrative is found in at least two pre-Islamic sources: the Infancy Gospel of Thomas and the Jewish Toledot Yeshu, with few variant details between the Quran and these two sources.

Healing the blind and the lepers

Similar to the New Testament, the Quran mentions Jesus healing the blind and the lepers in al-Imran (3) 49. Muslim scholar and judge al-Baydawi ( 1286) wrote how it was recorded that many thousands of people came to Jesus to be healed and that Jesus healed these diseases through prayer only. Medieval scholar al-Tha'labi wrote about how these two particular diseases were beyond medical help, and Jesus' miracles were meant to be witnessed by others as clear signs of his message.

Raising the dead

Jesus is believed to have raised people from the dead, as mentioned in al-Imran (3) 49. Although no detail is given as to who was raised or the circumstance, at least three people are mentioned in detail in the Christian Gospel (a daughter of Jairus, a widow's son at Nain, and Lazarus).

Prescience
Jesus was able to predict, or had foreknowledge, of what was hidden or unknown to others. One example is Jesus would answer correctly any and every question anyone asked him. Another example is Jesus knew what people had just eaten, as well as what they had stored in their homes.

Table of food from heaven

In the fifth chapter of the Quran, al-Ma'ida (5) 112–115, a narration mentions the disciples of Jesus requesting a table laden with food, and for it to be a special day of commemoration for them in the future. This may be a possible reference to the Eucharist according to professor of Islamic and Arabic studies W. Montgomery Watt ( 2006). According to professor of comparative religions Geoffrey Parrinder ( 2005), it is unclear if this story parallels the Gospel's Last Supper or the feeding the multitude, but may be tied to the Arabic word  (Muslim festival):

In a record by the Sunni exegete Tabari, before the last supper, the threat of death made him anxious. Therefore, Jesus invited his disciples for the last supper. After the meal, he washed their hands and performed their ablutions to wipe their hands on his clothing. Afterwards Jesus replied to them: "As for that I have done to you tonight, in that I served you the meal and washed your hands in person, let it be an example for you. Since you indeed consider me to be better than you, do not be haughty in relation to each other but rather expand yourselves for each other as I have expanded myself for you." After instructing the disciples in his teachings, Jesus foretells that one of them would deny him and another betray him. However, in accordance with Islamic views on Jesus' death, just a corpse in semblance of Jesus was crucified and Jesus himself was raised to God.

Other miracles
Many stories and narratives have been developed over the years about Jesus, containing certain inherent lessons or providing meaning due to the lack of detail in the Quran regarding Jesus. Some of these narratives are similar in nature to the New Testament, while some portray Jesus in a very human manner.

Besides some detailed summaries of miracles of Jesus mentioned by Muslim writers over the centuries, from adulthood (like walking on water – also found in the Gospel – and causing loaves of bread to come from the ground), some other miracles from childhood include: explaining the Muslim creed fundamentals to a schoolmaster, revealing who the thieves were to a wealthy chief, filling empty jars of something to drink, providing food and wine for a tyrannical king while also proving to this king his power in raising a dead man from the dead, raising a child accidentally killed, and causing the garments from a single-colored vat to come out with various colors.

Healing a royal official's son

Al-Tabari ( 923) reports a story of an adult Jesus' encounter with a certain king in the region and the healing of his son. The identity of the king is not mentioned while legend suggests Philip the Tetrarch. The corresponding Bible reference is "the royal official's son".

Greed and truth-telling
A legendary story of a miracle by a young Jesus, used as a hard-learned lesson popularly found in Middle Eastern lore according to professor Ayoub, has to do with a Jewish man and loaves of bread. Although carrying a polemic tone, the lesson centers on greed with truth-telling woven into the narration. It is a story found often in children's books.

Inherent wisdom

Another legendary miracle story is one regarding Jesus' childhood wisdom. This legend, reported through al-Tabari from ibn Ishaq, talks about Mary sending Jesus to a religious school and the teacher being astonished to find Jesus already knowing the information being taught / discussed.

Food in children's homes
Another story from al-Tabari tells of a young Jesus playing with the youths of his village and telling them what food their parents were preparing for them at home.

According to the details of the narrative, some parents became annoyed and forbade their children to play with Jesus, suspecting he was a magician. As a result, the parents kept their children away from Jesus and gathered their children into a single house. One day, feeling lonely, Jesus went out looking for his friends, and coming upon this house he asked the parents where their children were. The parents lied, responding that the children were not there. After Jesus asks who, then, is in the house, the parents call Jesus a pig. Jesus then says "Let there be swine in this house", turning all the children into swine.

Over the centuries, Muslim writers have also referenced other miracles like casting out demons, having borrowed from some heretical pre-Islamic sources, and from canonical sources as legends about Jesus were expanded.

Revelation

Traditional Islamic exegesis claims the biblical message to have been distorted, is termed  ("resolution of ambiguity"). This polemic effort has its origins in the medieval period with Abd al-Jabbar ibn Ahmad's writings. Regarding the Law of Moses, the Quran indicates that Jesus never abolished Jewish laws but rather confirmed them, while making partial abrogations only.

Muslims have long believed that Paul purposefully corrupted the original teachings of Jesus. The 9th-century historian Sayf ibn Umar asserted that certain rabbis persuaded Paul to deliberately misguide early Christians by introducing what Ibn Hazm viewed as objectionable doctrines into Christianity.

According to Yusuf al-Qaradawi in his book The Lawful and the Prohibited in Islam, the legal restrictions Jesus abrogated for Jews were those initially legislated by God as a punishment. Classical commentaries such as  specify they pertained to the consumption of fish and bird meat without spikes, or in general.

Disciples

The Quran states that Jesus was aided by a group of disciples who believed in his message. While not naming the disciples, the Quran does give a few instances of Jesus preaching the message to them. Muslims view the disciples of Jesus as identical to the companions of Muhammad. According to Christianity, the names of the twelve disciples were Peter, Andrew, James, John, Philip, Bartholomew, Thomas, Matthew, James, Jude, Simon, and Judas.

The Quran mentions in chapter 3, verses 52–53, that the disciples submitted to the faith of Islam:

The longest narrative involving Jesus' disciples is when Jesus performs the miracle of bringing a table of food from heaven at their request, for further proof that his preaching is the true message.

Ascension

An-Nisa's verse 157 is the primary verse of the Quran to refer to the event of Jesus' crucifixion. It says that Jesus was not killed and neither crucified, but "it was made to appear to them":

Most Islamic traditions categorically deny that Jesus physically died on the cross or otherwise. 

According to the Quran, he was not crucified, but was rather saved by God. (Although the earliest Islamic traditions and exegesis quote somewhat conflicting reports regarding a death and its length, Muslims believe that Jesus did not die on the cross, but believe that he was saved by being raised alive to heaven).

Substitution
It is unclear exactly where the substitutionist interpretation originated, but some scholars consider the theory originating among certain Gnostic groups of the second century. Leirvik finds the Quran and Hadith to have been clearly influenced by the non-canonical ('heretical') Christianity that prevailed in the Arab peninsula and further in Abyssinia.

While most Western scholars, Jews, and Christians believe Jesus died, orthodox Muslim theology teaches he ascended to Heaven without being put on the cross and God transformed another person, Simon of Cyrene, to appear exactly like Jesus who was crucified instead of Jesus (cf. Irenaeus' description of the heresy of Basilides, Book I, ch. XXIV, 4.).

Some disagreement and discord can be seen beginning with Ibn Ishaq's ( 761) report of a brief accounting of events leading up to the crucifixion, firstly stating that Jesus was replaced by someone named Sergius, while secondly reporting an account of Jesus' tomb being located at Medina, and thirdly citing the places in the Quran (3:55; 4:158) that God took Jesus up to himself.

Michael Cook notes that denial that Jesus died follows the Christian heresy of docetism, who were "disturbed by that God should have died", but that this concern conflicts with another Islamic doctrine, that Jesus was a man, not God. According to Todd Lawson, Quranic commentators seem to have concluded the denial of the crucifixion of Jesus by following material interpreted in Tafsir that relied upon extra-biblical Judeo-Christian sources, with the earliest textual evidence having originated from a non-Muslim source – a misreading of the Christian writings of John of Damascus regarding the literal understandings of docetism (exegetical doctrine describing spiritual and physical realities of Jesus as understood by men in logical terms) as opposed to their figurative explanations. John of Damascus highlighted the Quran's assertion that the Jews did not crucify Jesus being very different from saying that Jesus was not crucified, explaining that it is the varied Quranic exegetes in Tafsir, and not the Quran itself, that denies the crucifixion, further stating that the message in the 4:157 verse simply affirms the historicity of the event.

Symbolic interpretations 
Ja'far ibn Mansur al-Yaman ( 958), Abu Hatim Ahmad ibn Hamdan al-Razi ( 935), Abu Yaqub al-Sijistani ( 971), Mu'ayyad fi'l-Din al-Shirazi ( 1078) and the group Ikhwan al-Safa also affirm the historicity of the Crucifixion, reporting Jesus was crucified and not substituted by another man as maintained by many other popular Quranic commentators and Tafsir. More recently, Mahmoud M. Ayoub, a professor and scholar, provided a more symbolic interpretation for Surah 4 Verse 157:

Ayoub, instead of interpreting the passage as a denial of the death of Jesus, instead believes the passage is about God denying men the power to vanquish and destroy God's message. The words "but they killed him not, nor crucified him" are meant to show that any power humans believe that they have against God is illusory.

Some Sunni Islamic exegesists, such as the anti-Christian polemicist Muhammad Rashid Rida, held an ambigious stance on the matter, namely that the crucifixion and ascension of Jesus were allegorical, but with extreme precaution, in order to rebut Christian doctrines on crucifixion and salvation.

An early interpretation of verse 3:55 (specifically "I will cause you to die and raise you to myself"), Al-Tabari ( 923), records an interpretation attributed to Ibn 'Abbas, who used the literal "I will cause you to die" in place of the metaphorical  ('Jesus died'), while Wahb ibn Munabbih, an early Jewish convert, is reported to have said "God caused Jesus, son of Mary, to die for three hours during the day, then took him up to himself." Tabari further transmits from Ibn Ishaq: "God caused Jesus to die for seven hours", while at another place reported that a person called Sergius was crucified in place of Jesus. Ibn-al-Athir forwarded the report that it was Judas, the betrayer, while also mentioning the possibility it was a man named Natlianus.

In reference to the Quranic quote "We have surely killed Jesus the Christ, son of Mary, the apostle of God", Muslim scholar Mahmoud Ayoub asserts this boast not as the repeating of a historical lie or the perpetuating of a false report, but an example of human arrogance and folly with an attitude of contempt towards God and his messenger(s). Ayoub furthers what modern scholars of Islam interpret regarding the historical death of Jesus, the man, as man's inability to kill off God's Word and the Spirit of God, which the Quran testifies were embodied in Jesus Christ. Ayoub continues highlighting the denial of the killing of Jesus as God denying men such power to vanquish and destroy the divine Word. The words, "they did not kill him, nor did they crucify him" speaks to the profound events of ephemeral human history, exposing mankind's heart and conscience towards God's will. The claim of humanity to have this power against God is illusory. "They did not slay him... but it seemed so to them" speaks to the imaginations of mankind, not the denial of the actual event of Jesus dying physically on the cross.

Another report from Ibn Kathir quotes Ishaq Ibn Bishr, on authority of Idris, on authority of Wahb ibn Munabbih, that "God caused him to die for three days, then resurrected him, then raised him."

Al-Masudi ( 956) reported the death of Christ under Tiberius.

Ibn Kathir ( 1373) follows traditions which suggest that a crucifixion did occur, but not with Jesus. After the event, Ibn Kathir reports the people were divided into three groups following three different narratives; The Jacobites believing "God remained with us as long as He willed and then He ascended to Heaven"; the Nestorians believing "The son of God was with us as long as he willed until God raised him to heaven"; and the Muslims believing "The servant and messenger of God, Jesus, remained with us as long as God willed until God raised him to Himself."

Islamic reformer Muhammad Rashid Rida agrees with contemporary commentators interpreting the physical killing of Christ's apostleship as a metaphorical interpretation.

Modern Islamic scholars like Sayyid Muhammad Husayn Tabataba'i interpret the ascension of Jesus as spiritual, not physical. This interpretation is in accord with Muʿtazila and Shia metaphorical explanations regarding anthropomorphic references to God in the Quran. Although not popular with traditional Sunni interpretations of the depiction of crucifixion, there has been much speculation and discussion in the effort of logically reconciling this topic.

In ascetic Shia writings, Jesus is depicted having "ascended to heaven wearing a woolen shirt, spun and sewed by Mary, his mother. As he reached the heavenly regions, he was addressed, 'O Jesus, cast away from you the adornment of the world. After his ascension, his word is believed to have been altered.

Second Coming

According to Islamic tradition, having ascended to heaven and dwelled there for 2000+ years, Jesus will descend to earth shortly before Judgement Day, in the midst of wars fought against al-Masih ad-Dajjal ('The False Messiah") and his followers, to come to the aid of the Mahdi and his Muslim followers. Dressed in saffron robes with his head anointed, Jesus will descend at the point of a white minaret, in eastern Damascus, which is believed to be the Minaret of Isa in the Umayyad Mosque. He will then greet the Mahdi and (being a Muslim) pray beside him. Eventually, Jesus will slay the Dajjal at Lod.

Afterwards, he will "break the cross, kill the pigs, and abolish the Jizya tax", according to a well-known Sahih al-Bukhari hadith. "The usual interpretation" of this prophecy is that, being a Muslim, Jesus will put a stop to Christian worship of himself and in belief in his divinity, "symbolized by the cross". He will re-establish the Kosher/Halal dietary laws abandoned by Christianity; and because Jews and Christians will now all reject their former faith and accept Islam, there will be no more need for the  tax on unbelievers. (According to one hadith, Jesus will "destroy the churches and temples and kill the Christians unless they believe in him."){{#tag:ref|see also: "Others, however, understand the second coming of 'Isa ... [is] to kill the Dajjil, to break the cross and decimate all Christians and their places of worship, and to inaugurate the aforementioned period of peace before the actual coming of the Hour".<ref>{{cite book |last1=Smith|first1= Jane I. |first2= Yvonne Y. |last2=Haddad |date=1981 |title=The Islamic Understanding of Death and Resurrection |page=69 |location=Albany, N Y |publisher=SUNY Press |url=https://vdoc.pub/download/the-islamic-understanding-of-death-and-resurrection-1fa354cla15g |ref=JISYYHIU1981}}</ref>|group=note}}

Islamic texts also allude to the reappearance of the ancient menace Gog and Magog, which will break out of its underground confinement and cause havoc around the world. God, in response to Jesus' prayers, will kill them by sending a type of worm in the napes of their necks, and send large birds to carry and clear their corpses from the land. After the death of the Mahdi, Jesus will assume world leadership and peace and justice will be universal.

Also according to tradition, Jesus will then marry, have children, and rule the world for forty years (traditions give many different time periods) after which he will die. Muslims will then perform the funeral prayer for him and then bury him at the Green Dome in the city of Medina in a grave left vacant beside Muhammad, Abu Bakr, and Umar respectively. According to Ibn Khaldun's legend, the two caliphs will rise from the dead between the two prophets.

Sources
While the Quran does not describe any of the above narrative of Jesus' return, many Muslims believe that two Quranic verses refer to his second coming during the end times. (1) The verse mentioned above stating he is never died on earth:  
"And [for] their saying, 'Indeed, we have killed Christ, Jesus, the son of Mary, the messenger of God.' And they did not kill him, nor did they crucify him; but [another] was made to resemble him to them. And indeed, those who differ over it are in doubt about it. They have no knowledge of it except the following of assumption. And they did not kill him, for certain." (Q.4:157:) 
A second verse interpreted to indicate a connection between Jesus and "the Hour" (end times): 
"And lo! verily there is knowledge of the Hour. So doubt ye not concerning it, but follow Me. This is the right path." (Q.43:61 trans Pickthall).

While for Shias, the Mahdi will be the savior, some Sunnis tended to expect Jesus' return. During the early Abbasid Caliphate, wearing crucifixes in processions and holding pigs in public, was forbidden. Otherwise, the breaking of the cross, might reflect general disapproval of this symbol by Muslims, and slaying pigs a reference to Jesus exorcism of Legion.

 Islamic theology 

Jesus is described by various means in the Quran. According to Islam, Jesus never claimed to be divine.

Islam sees Jesus as human, sent as the last prophet of Israel to Jews with the Gospel scripture, affirming but modifying the Mosaic Law. Mainstream Islamic traditions have rejected any divine notions of Jesus being God, or begotten Son of God, or the Trinity. Popular theology teaches such beliefs constitute  (the "association" of partners with God) and thereby a rejection of his divine oneness as the sole unpardonable sin.

A widespread polemic directed to these doctrinal origins are ascribed to Paul the Apostle, regarded by some Muslims as a heretic, as well as an evolution across the Greco-Roman world causing pagan influences to corrupt God's revelation. The theological absence of Original Sin in Islam renders the Christian concepts of Atonement and Redemption as redundant. Jesus simply conforms to the prophetic mission of his predecessors.

Jesus is understood to have preached salvation through submission to God's will and worshipping God alone. The Quran states that Jesus will ultimately deny claiming divinity in Al-Ma'idah 5:116. Thus, he is considered to have been a Muslim by the religious definition of the term (i.e., one who submits to God's will), as understood in Islam regarding all other prophets that preceded him.

Although the Quran is silent on its significance, scholars disagree with the Christian concepts of the term, and lean towards a Jewish understanding. Muslim exegetes explain the use of the word  in the Quran as referring to Jesus' status as the one anointed by means of blessings and honors; or as the one who helped cure the sick, by anointing the eyes of the blind, for example.

Jesus also holds a description as both a word from God and a soul. The interpretation behind Jesus as a spirit from God, is seen as his human soul. Some Muslim scholars occasionally see the spirit as the archangel Gabriel, but majority consider the spirit to be Jesus himself.

Jesus is mentioned about 187 times in the Quran, directly and indirectly, and also referred to by many titles, the most common being  ('the Messiah'). Jesus is referred to 25 times by the name Isa, 48 times in the third-person, 35 times in the first-person, and is mentioned the remaining times by various titles in the Quran.

Muhammad described himself as the "nearest of all people to Jesus".

Similitude with Adam
The Quran emphasizes the creationism of Jesus, through his similitude with Adam in regards to the absence of human origin. Muhammad often used to compare the births of Adam and Jesus.

Islamic exegesis extrapolates a logical inconsistency behind the Christian argument of divine intervention, as such implications would have ascribed divinity to Adam who is understood only as creation.

 Precursor to Muhammad 

In Islam, Jesus is believed to have been the precursor to the Islamic prophet Muhammad. According to the Quran, the coming of Muhammad was predicted by Jesus in As-Saff 61:6. Through this verse, early Arab Muslims claimed legitimacy for their new faith in the existing religious traditions and the alleged predictions of Jesus. Muslims believe that Jesus was a precursor to Muhammad, and that he prophesied the latter's coming. This perspective is based on a verse of the Quran wherein Jesus speaks of a messenger to appear after him named "Ahmad". Islam associates Ahmad with Muhammad, both words deriving from the h-m-d triconsonantal root which refers to praiseworthiness. Muslims assert that evidence of Jesus' pronouncement is present in the New Testament, citing the mention of the Paraclete whose coming is foretold in the Gospel of John.

This idea is debated, asking if the traditional understanding is supported by the text of the Quran.

Islamic theology claims Jesus had foretold another prophet succeeding him according to Sura 61:6, with the mention of the name 'Ahmad'. (Ahmad is an Arabic name from the same triconsonantal root Ḥ-M-D = [ح – م – د].) In responding to Ibn Ishaq's biography of Muhammad, the Sirat Rasul Allah, Islamic scholar Alfred Guillaume wrote:

Messianism
An alternative, more esoteric, interpretation is expounded by Messianic Muslims in the Sufi and Isma'ili traditions so as to unite Islam, Christianity and Judaism into a single religious continuum. Other Messianic Muslims hold a similar theological view regarding Jesus, without attempting to unite the religions. Making use of the New Testament's distinguishing between Jesus, Son of Man (being the physical human Jesus), and Christ, Son of God (being the Holy Spirit of God residing in the body of Jesus), the Holy Spirit, being immortal and immaterial, is not subject to crucifixion – for it can never die, nor can it be touched by the earthly nails of the crucifixion, for it is a being of pure spirit. Thus, while the spirit of Christ avoided crucifixion by ascending unto God, the body that was Jesus was sacrificed on the cross, thereby bringing the Old Testament to final fulfillment. Thus Quranic passages on the death of Jesus affirm that while the Pharisees intended to destroy Jesus completely, they, in fact, succeeded only in killing the Son of Man, being his  ('material being'). Meanwhile, the Son of God, being his  ('spiritual being') remained alive and undying – because it is the Holy Spirit.

 Islamic literature 

The Quran does not convey the specific teachings of Jesus. What has developed over the years was authored by later followers of Islam. What is found in the Quran about Jesus is that his teaching conformed to the prophetic model: a human sent by God to present both a judgment upon humanity for worshipping idols and a challenge to turn to the one true God. In the case of Jesus, Muslims believe that his mission was to the people of Israel and that his status as a prophet was confirmed by numerous miracles. The Quran's description of specific events at the end of Jesus' life have continued to be controversial between Christians and Muslims, while the classical commentaries have been interpreted differently to accommodate new information. Jesus is written about by some Muslim scholars as the perfect man.

Hadith

The Hadiths are reported sayings of Muhammad that developed a canonical status in the third Muslim century as a source of authority for the Muslim community. The Muslim perception of Jesus emerging from the Hadiths is of a miraculous, sinless, and eschatological figure, pointing people, again according to the Muslim's perspective of prophethood, to the Muslim faith (Muslim; one who submits to the will of God).

Jesus is featured as a major figure in two categories of hadiths which can be described as apocalyptic and biblical.

Sunni Islam
In , al-Shahrastani ( 1153), an influential Persian historian, historiographer, scholar, philosopher and theologian, records a portrayal of Jesus very close to the orthodox tenets while continuing the Islamic narrative:

Shia Islam
In the Nahj al-Balagha, the fourth caliph Ali is reported to have talked about the simplicity of Jesus. Ali says that "Jesus used a stone for his pillow, put on coarse clothes and ate rough food. His condiment was hunger. His lamp at night was the moon. He had no wife to allure him, nor any son to give grief, neither wealth to deviate. His two feet were his conveyance and his two hands were his servant". According to Ja'far al-Sadiq, a great-great grandson of Ali, the time between David and Jesus was four hundred years. Ja'far further says that the religion of Jesus was monotheism and purity. The  (Gospel) was sent down to him and the pledge that other prophets took was also taken from Jesus: to establish prayer with religion, enjoin the good and forbid the evil, allowing what is allowed and forbidding what has been forbidden. He was sent what was an alleviation of what was sent down to Moses in the Torah.

According to Qadi al-Nu'man, a famous Muslim jurist of the Fatimid period, Jesus is referred to as the Messiah in the Quran because he was sent to the people who responded to him in order to remove their impurities, the ailments of their faith; whether apparent or hidden. Qadi al- Nu'man, in his work Foundation of Symbolic Interpretation, talks about the spiritual birth of Jesus, as an interpretation of his story of physical birth mentioned in the Quran. He says that Mary, the mother of Jesus, is a metaphor for someone who nurtured and instructed Jesus, rather than physically giving birth to him. Qadi al-Nu'man explains that Jesus was from the pure progeny of Abraham, just as Ali and his sons were from the pure progeny of Muhammad, through Fatima.

Sufism
Early Sufis adopted the sayings of Jesus in the Sermon on the Mount and an ascetic dimension. The submission and sacrifice Jesus exemplified shows the Muslim is to be set apart from worldly compromises. In poetry and mysticism, Jesus was celebrated as a prophet close to the heart of God achieving an uncommon degree of self-denial.

Although the writings developed over the centuries embellished Jesus' miracles, the lessons of Jesus can be seen as metaphors of the inner life. These rich and diverse presentations of Jesus in Sufi traditions are the largest body of Jesus-texts in any non-Christian tradition.

The miraculous birth and life of Jesus becomes a metaphor for Rumi of the spiritual rebirth that is possible within each human soul. This rebirth is not achieved without effort; one needs to practice silence, poverty, and fasting—themes that were prominent in Jesus' life according to Islamic traditions.

Ibn Arabi stated Jesus was Al-Insān al-Kāmil, the spirit and simultaneously a servant of God. Jesus is held to be "one with God" in whole coincidence of will, not as a being. Due to the spirit of God dwelling in Jesus, God spoke and acted through him. Yet Jesus is not considered to be God, but a person within God's word and spirit and a manifestation of God's attributes, like a mirror.

The conception of Jesus as described by Ibn Arabi ( 1240), an Andalusian scholar, Sufi mystic, poet and philosopher, in the Bezels of Wisdom:

 Ascetic literature 
Jesus is widely venerated in Muslim ascetic and mystic literature, such as in Muslim mystic Al-Ghazali's  ('The revival of the religious sciences'). These works lay stress upon Jesus' poverty, his preoccupation with worship, his detachment from worldly life and his miracles. Such depictions also include advice and sermons which are attributed to him. Later Sufic commentaries adapted material from Christian gospels which were consistent with their ascetic portrayal. Sufi philosopher Ibn Arabi described Jesus as "the seal of universal holiness" due to the quality of his faith and "because he holds in his hands the keys of living breath and because he is at present in a state of deprivation and journeying".

 Ahmadiyya literature 

The Ahmadiyya Movement considers Jesus was a prophet and a mortal man, who was crucified and remained on the cross for six hours, until darkness fell. Jesus was taken down from the cross alive and unconscious. He was treated for three days and nights by saint physician Necdemus in a cave like tomb (especially built for Joseph of Arimathea). Thereafter, Jesus recuperated from his wounds, met his trusted disciples on the Mount of Olives, and left Judea towards the sea of Galilee on his way to Damascus. After his dramatic escape from crucifixion, Jesus traveled to the eastern lands in search of the ten lost tribes of Israel. Finally, he died a natural death in Kashmir, India, as opposed to having been raised up alive to Heaven.

 Appearance 
Based upon several Hadith narrations of Muhammad, Jesus can be physically described thus (with any differences in Jesus' physical description being due to Muhammad describing him when seeing him at different occasions, such as during his ascension to Heaven, or when describing Jesus during Jesus' second coming):
A well-built man of medium/moderate/average height and stature with a broad chest.
Straight, lank, and long hair that fell between his shoulders. It seems as though water is dribbling from his head, though it is not wet.

See also

References
 Notes 

Citations

Sources

 

 
 
 
 
 
 
 
 
  Google books site
 
 
 
 
 
 

 
 

 

Further reading

 
Zuckermann, Ghil'ad (2006). "'Etymythological Othering' and the Power of 'Lexical Engineering' in Judaism, Islam and Christianity. A Socio-Philo(sopho)logical Perspective", Explorations in the Sociology of Language and Religion'', edited by Tope Omoniyi and Joshua A. Fishman, Amsterdam: John Benjamins, pp. 237–258.

External links 

 Jesus: A Summary of the Points About Which Islam and Christianity Agree and Disagree Dr. Alan Godlas, University of Georgia.
 What Do Muslims Think About Jesus – Royal Embassy of Saudi Arabia
 Jesus Through Muslim Eyes – BBC
 The Story of Jesus Through Iranian Eyes – ABC News
 7 Muslim Beliefs about Jesus Dr. Warren Larson
 Alim.org Surah 3. Al-i'Imran, Ayah 4

 
New Testament people in Islam
Entering heaven alive